This is a list of captains regent (Capitani Reggenti) of San Marino from 1243 to 1500 (information is very incomplete for the early period).

Notes

See also
 Diarchy
 List of captains regent of San Marino, 1500–1700
 List of captains regent of San Marino, 1700–1900
 List of captains regent of San Marino, 1900–present
 Mucciolo (family)
 Politics of San Marino

List 1243-1500
San Marino, Captains-Regent 1243-1500
Captains Regent